Xiaobei Station is a station on Line 5 of the Guangzhou Metro. It is located under East Huanshi Road near the Beixiu Building in the Yuexiu District. It opened on 28December 2009.

Station layout

Exits

References

Railway stations in China opened in 2009
Guangzhou Metro stations in Yuexiu District